The following is a list of mayors who have declared themselves to be socialists or have been a member of a socialist party in the United States.

In 1911 it was estimated that there were twenty-eight such mayors and in 1913 thirty-four. In 1967, however, James Weinstein's table of "Cities and Towns Electing Socialist Mayors or Other Major Municipal Officers, 1911–1920" counted 74 such municipalities in 1911 and 32 in 1913, with smaller peaks in 1915 (22) and 1917 (18).

List of mayors

 Denotes incumbent

See also 
 List of socialist members of the United States Congress

Notes
I Barewald resigned from the Socialist Party during the first week of January 1921 and captured national headlines by declaring radicals "insane" and instructing local police to greet unwanted members of the Industrial Workers of the World with "hot lead." See: "Wants Town Rid of IWW: Mayor Barewald Advises Use of Riot Guns," Eugene Morning Register, Jan. 9, 1921, pg. 1.
II Ran for the Rockford Progressive Party, which was formed by dissidents of the Rockford Labor Party in 1929.
III Clavelle became a member of the Democratic Party in 2004.
IV Chase and Coulter were both elected mayor for the Social Democratic Party, but the party later merged itself with a dissident faction of the Socialist Labor Party in 1901 and founded the Socialist Party of America.
V His name is alternatively spelled Lewis J. Duncan.
VI Was running for the Rockford Labor Legion from 1921–1927, in 1929 the Labor Party refused to nominate him on the grounds that he had moved from some of the party's principles. He ran as an independent from 1929-33.
 The Rockford Labor Legion was a coalition of local trade unions, socialist organizations and temperance societies.
VII Lumumba was self-described as a socialist.
VIII Sanders has declared himself to be a democratic socialist.
IX Van Lear was expelled from the Socialist Party in 1918

Footnotes

Bibliography

 Benjamin F. Arrington, Municipal History of Essex County in Massachusetts. Chicago: Lewis Historical Publishing Company, 1922; pg. 976.
 Henry F. Bedford, Socialism and the Workers in Massachusetts, 1886-1912. Amherst, MA: University of Massachusetts Press, 1966.
 Henry Bengston, On the Left in America: Memoirs of the Scandinavian-American Labor Movement. SIU Press, 1999; pg. 237.
 Hiram Taylor French, History of Idaho: A Narrative Account of Its Historical Progress, Its People and Its Principal Interests. New York: New York Public Library, 1914; pg. 976.
 C. Hal Nelson, Sinnissippi Saga: A History of Rockford and Winnebago County, Illinois.  Winnebago County Illinois Sesquicentennial Committee, 1968; pg. 536.
 Jack Ross, "Socialist Elected Officeholders, 1897-1960." The Socialist Party of America: A Complete History. Lincoln, NE: Potomac Books, 2015; pp. 609–638.
 James Weinstein, The Decline of Socialism in America 1912–1925. New York: Monthly Review Press, 1967; pp. 116–118.

 Mayors
Lists of mayors of places in the United States
Socialism-related lists